The year 2004 was the 223rd year of the Rattanakosin Kingdom of Thailand. It was the 59th year in the reign of King Bhumibol Adulyadej (Rama IX), and is reckoned as year 2547 in the Buddhist Era.

Incumbents
King: Bhumibol Adulyadej 
Crown Prince: Vajiralongkorn
Prime Minister: Thaksin Shinawatra
Supreme Patriarch: Nyanasamvara Suvaddhana

Events

January
2004 Bangkok International Film Festival took place from January 22 to February 2. Many awards were given out. A list of awards given out can be viewed here.

February

March
Miss Thailand Universe 2004 was a beauty contest held on March 27. Morakot Aimee Kittisara was the winner.

July
XV International AIDS Conference, 2004 was held from July 11 to July 16 in Bangkok.

August
2004 Bangkok gubernatorial election was held on August 29. Apirak Kosayodhin, who belonged to the Democrat party, won the election.

October
Tak Bai incident occurred on October 25 and resulted in 85 deaths.

December

2004 Indian Ocean earthquake and tsunami occurred on December 26.

Births

Deaths
26 December - Poom Jensen

See also
 List of Thai films of 2004
 2004 in Thai television
2004 Thailand national football team results
2004 Thailand National Games
Miss Thailand Universe 2004
2004 ASEAN Football Championship
2004 Thailand Open (tennis)

References

External links
Year 2004 Calendar - Thailand

 
Years of the 21st century in Thailand
Thailand